Omri Afek (born 31 March 1979) is a retired Israeli footballer who last played for Bnei Yehuda Tel Aviv. 

Afek was mainly a midfielder that also operated as a defender.

Early life
Afek was born in Kiryat Ono, Israel, to a Jewish family.

Football career
During his professional career, Afek played for Hapoel Tel Aviv, Maccabi Jaffa (loan), Beitar Jerusalem, Maccabi Haifa and Bnei Yehuda Tel Aviv.

He also had a two-year abroad spell at Racing de Santander; in 2003–04 La Liga, he signed alongside compatriot Dudu Aouate, both rejoining Yossi Benayoun - the club also sold that very summer a fourth Israeli, Ilan Bakhar. In his second year, Afek was loaned to Segunda División outfit UD Salamanca.

Honours
Israeli League: 1999–2000, 2006–07, 2008–09
Israeli Cup: 1999–2000
Toto Cup: 2007–08

External links
 
 

1979 births
Living people
Israeli Jews
Israeli footballers
Hapoel Tel Aviv F.C. players
Maccabi Jaffa F.C. players
Racing de Santander players
UD Salamanca players
Beitar Jerusalem F.C. players
Maccabi Haifa F.C. players
Bnei Yehuda Tel Aviv F.C. players
Liga Leumit players
Israeli Premier League players
Segunda División players
La Liga players
Israel international footballers
Israeli expatriate footballers
Expatriate footballers in Spain
Israeli expatriate sportspeople in Spain
People from Kiryat Ono
Association football midfielders
Association football defenders
Ono Academic College alumni